Drug precursors, also referred to as precursor chemicals or simply precursors, are substances which are known to be used in the illegal manufacture of illicit drugs. Most precursors also have legitimate commercial uses and are legally used in a wide variety of industrial processes and consumer products, such as medicines, flavourings, and fragrances.

International regulators of precursor chemicals consider it necessary to recognise and protect the legal trade of these chemicals, while at the same time preventing their diversion from such trade for use in the illegal manufacture of narcotic drugs and psychoactive substances. For example, phenylacetic acid is used legally in the production of penicillin, flavourings, perfume, and cleaning solutions, but it can also be used in the illegal manufacture of amphetamines and methamphetamine. The international framework for precursor control is set out under Articles 12 and 13 of the 1988 United Nations Convention against Illicit Traffic in Narcotic Drugs and Psychotropic Substances, requiring UN member states to establish and enforce regulatory systems that monitor the trade in their country, as well as movement of precursor chemicals into and out of their country (e.g. transshipment). Monitoring is carried out through measures including the licensing and registration of operators, procedures and requirements governing movement of chemicals, as well as documentation, record keeping and labelling requirements. The International Narcotics Control Board has also established tools including the Pre-Export Notification Online (PEN-Online) and Precursors Incident Communication (PICS) systems, in addition to annual information reporting through 'Form D' and the International Special Surveillance List (ISSL) for non-controlled and designer chemicals which can be used as precursors themselves for certain illicit drugs or pre-precursors, to support UN Member States in their domestic regulatory efforts and cross-border coordination. There is also harmonised legislation across Europe which puts a control system in place with the aim to achieve a balance between precursor diversion prevention without inhibiting legal trade.

The East Asia and Southeast Asia regions are referred to by many regulatory and law enforcement experts as the largest source for precursor chemicals used for illicit drug production, including by the INCB and UN Office on Drugs and Crime, in-part because a wide variety of chemicals are frequently diverted and trafficked within the region and to other parts of the world including to North America, Central and South America, Oceania (Australia and New Zealand), Europe, and Africa.

Trafficking
Organized crime groups operating in East and Southeast Asia have demonstrated significant sophistication in recent years, as well as their comparative advantage when it comes to sourcing precursors and specialized non-controlled precursor and pre-precursor chemicals for the illicit manufacture of drugs. Aside from regulatory controls that are easily bypassed, Southeast Asia, and in particular the Mekong sub-region, is situated next to two of the world's leading chemical-producing countries, China and India. However, while the chemical and pharmaceutical industries of China, and to a lesser extent India, are known to be the primary sources of the chemicals used for illicit drug production in Southeast Asia, these industries have also grown rapidly within the region itself in recent years and play an increasingly important role in the illicit drug trade. For example, between 2010 and 2018, outputs of chemicals and their products in Indonesia, Malaysia, the Philippines, Singapore, Thailand, and Vietnam, increased in value by nearly 40 per cent from US$132 billion to US$181 billion.

Examples of such precursors and drugs made with them are listed below.

Precursors
 2C-H
 2C-x
 N-Acetylanthranilic acid
 methaqualone
 Anthranilic acid
 methaqualone
 Benzaldehyde
 amphetamine
 phenylacetone
 Benzyl cyanide
 phenylacetone
 Ephedrine and pseudoephedrine
 methamphetamine
 methcathinone
 Ergocristine, ergine, ergonovine, and ergotamine
 LSD
 Ethylamine
 ethylamphetamine
 GBL
 GHB
 Safrole, isosafrole, and 3,4-methylenedioxyphenylpropan-2-one
 MDMA, MDEA, MDA
 Methylamine
 methamphetamine
 N-Methylephedrine and N-methylpseudoephedrine
 dimethylamphetamine
 N-Phenethyl-4-piperidone (NPP)
 fentanyl and analogues
 Nitroethane
 amphetamine
 MDA
 phenylacetone
 Norpseudoephedrine and phenylpropanolamine
 amphetamine
 4-methylaminorex
 Phenylacetic acid
 phenylacetone
 Piperidine
 phencyclidine (PCP)
 Piperonal (heliotropin)
 MDMA, MDEA, MDA
 Propionic anhydride
 fentanyl and analogues
 Acetic anhydride
 heroin
 methaqualone
 phenylacetone
 Benzyl chloride
 methamphetamine
 1-(2-Chloro-N-methylbenzimidoyl)cyclopentanol
 ketamine

Reagents
 Hydriodic acid
 methamphetamine
 Hypophosphorous acid
 amphetamine
 methamphetamine
 Iodine
 amphetamine
 methamphetamine
 Red phosphorus and white phosphorus
 amphetamine
 methamphetamine
 Potassium permanganate
 cocaine
 methcathinone
 Sodium permanganate
 cocaine
 Hydrochloric acid (hydrogen chloride)
 amphetamine
 cocaine
 N,N-dimethylamphetamine
 ethylamphetamine
 fentanyl and analogues
 heroin
 LSD
 MDA
 MDE
 MDMA
 methamphetamine
 methaqualone
 methcathinone
 phencyclidine (PCP)
 Sulfuric acid
 amphetamine
 cocaine
 MDA
 MDE
 MDMA
 methamphetamine
 methaqualone
 phenylacetone

Solvents
 Acetone
 cocaine
 heroin
 LSD
 MDA
 MDE
 MDMA
 methamphetamine
 Diethyl ether
 amphetamine
 cocaine
 fentanyl and analogues
 heroin
 LSD
 MDA
 MDE
 MDMA
 methamphetamine
 methaqualone
 methcathinone
 phencyclidine (PCP)
 phenylacetone
 Methylethylketone (butanone) and methyl isobutyl ketone
 cocaine
 heroin
 MDA
 MDEA
 methamphetamine
 Toluene
 cocaine
 fentanyl and analogues
 methaqualone
 phencyclidine (PCP)
 phenylacetone

References

See also
 Chemical Diversion and Trafficking Act
 Clandestine chemistry
 Combat Methamphetamine Epidemic Act of 2005
 Controlled Substances Act
 DEA list of chemicals
 European law on drug precursors
 United Nations Convention Against Illicit Traffic in Narcotic Drugs and Psychotropic Substances

Drug culture
Drug-related lists
Illegal drug trade